A snow field, snowfield  or neve is an accumulation of permanent snow and ice, typically found above the snow line, normally in mountainous and glacial terrain.

Glaciers originate in snowfields. The lower end of a glacier is usually free from snow and névé in summer. In the upper end and above the upper boundary of a glacier, the snow field is an ice field covered with snow. The glacier upper boundary, where it emerges from under a snow field, is ill-defined because of gradual transition.

References

Bodies of ice
Landforms
 

it:Formazioni nevose perenni#Nevaio